Shira may refer to:

Geography
Shira, or Sira, Karnataka, a taluk in Tumkur district, Karnataka, India
Shira, Iran, in Mazandaran Province
Shira, Nigeria
Shira, Russia, a rural locality (selo) in Shirinsky District, Republic of Khakassia, Russia
Shira (railway station)
Lake Shira, a lake near Shira in the Republic of Khakassia, Russia
River Shira, a river in Argyll and Bute, Scotland, that flows into Dubh Loch
The western peak of Mount Kilimanjaro

People and characters
Shira (given name), a Hebrew feminine name
Charles Shira, former head football coach at Mississippi State University
Nihim D. Shira, Indian politician
Shira, a character in the film Ice Age: Continental Drift

Other uses
Shira (book), a 1971 novel by Israeli Nobel Prize laureate Shmuel Yosef Agnon
Shira language, a Bantu language of Gabon
Shira people, a Punu ethnic group of Gabon
Shira, or Sajjige, an Indian sweet dish (halva) prepared from rava or sajjige (semolina) of wheat

See also
Shiira, a web browser for the Mac OS X operating system
Shiras, a surname
She-Ra, the animation series character